Suan Luang Rama IX, also referred to as (King) Rama IX Park, is a public park in Bangkok's Prawet District.

The park was built to celebrate King Bhumibol Adulyadej's sixtieth birthday in 1987, and was opened by the King on 1 December that year. It features extensive botanical gardens, a lake, and a pavilion housing exhibits in honour of the King. The park is managed by the Suan Luang Rama 9 Foundation.

The "Phanmai Ngam Aram Suan Luang Ror Kao" (Beautiful Flora in the Suan Luang Rama IX Park) fair is held annually here in December since 1987, the year it was founded.

References

External links

Parks in Bangkok
Prawet district
Monuments and memorials to Bhumibol Adulyadej